"Honky Tonkin's What I Do Best" is a song written by Marty Stuart, and recorded by American country music artists Stuart and Travis Tritt.  It was released in April 1996 as the first single and title track from the album Honky Tonkin's What I Do Best.  The song reached number 23 on the Billboard Hot Country Singles & Tracks chart and peaked at number 8 on the RPM Country Tracks chart in Canada. It was nominated for the 1997 Grammy Award for Best Country Collaboration with Vocals, but lost to High Lonesome Sound by Vince Gill. It was also nominated for a CMA Vocal Event Of The Year Award in 1996.

Music video
The music video was directed by Michael Merriman and premiered in May 1996.

Chart performance

Year-end charts

References

1996 singles
1996 songs
Marty Stuart songs
Travis Tritt songs
Songs written by Marty Stuart
Song recordings produced by Tony Brown (record producer)
Male vocal duets
MCA Records singles